Landon Turner (born May 15, 1993) is an American football guard who is currently a free agent. He played college football at North Carolina. His uncle Jim Braxton played professionally for the Bills and Dolphins in the 1970s.

High school career
Turner was a four-year starter at Harrisonburg High School in Harrisonburg, Virginia.  He was All-State his junior and senior years, as he paved the way for running back Michael Holmes, who later played at Virginia Tech, to rush for more than 5,000 yards combined in both seasons. In Turner's senior season, he helped Harrisonburg to the VHSL Division 4 state final, where they lost 41–21 to Alex Carter's Briar Woods High School. Turner was named a U.S. Army All-American and Parade All-American following his senior year.

College career
After redshirting his first year at North Carolina, Turner saw action in twelve games in 2012. He served as a backup his first eight games, before replacing an injured Brennan Williams at right guard for the final four games of the season. He would remain a starter throughout his four years. In his junior year, he was named 3rd team All-ACC by the media.  As a senior, he was named consensus 1st-Team All-ACC and 1st Team All-American by the Associated Press (AP) and won the Jim Parker Trophy.

Professional career

New Orleans Saints
Turner was signed by the New Orleans Saints as an undrafted free agent following the 2016 NFL Draft.

On September 2, 2017, Turner was waived by the Saints and was signed to the practice squad the next day. He signed a reserve/future contract with the Saints on January 16, 2018.

On September 1, 2018, Turner was waived by the Saints. He was re-signed to the practice squad on October 24, 2018, but was released three days later.

Minnesota Vikings
On October 30, 2018, Turner was signed to the Minnesota Vikings practice squad. He was released on November 8, 2018.

Carolina Panthers
On December 19, 2018, Turner was signed to the Carolina Panthers practice squad. He signed a reserve/future contract with the Panthers on December 31, 2018. He was waived on May 29, 2019.

Seattle Seahawks
On August 20, 2019, Turner was signed by the Seattle Seahawks. He was waived on August 31, 2019.

References

External links
North Carolina Tar Heels bio

1993 births
Living people
People from Harrisonburg, Virginia
Players of American football from Virginia
American football offensive guards
North Carolina Tar Heels football players
New Orleans Saints players
Minnesota Vikings players
Carolina Panthers players
Seattle Seahawks players